XETIA-AM is a radio station on 1310 AM in Tonalá, Jalisco. It is owned by Unidifusión and carries a romantic music format known as Radio Vital.

History

XEJE-AM received its concession on March 9, 1945. It was owned by Guillermo Johnston and broadcast with 250 watts. XEJE became XETIA-AM by the 1960s and was sold twice, once to Radiodifusoras de Occidente in 1960, and again to Radio Sinfonía, S.A. in 1967. This latter owner succeeded in obtaining a sister FM station for XETIA, XETIA-FM. Power was raised from 1 to 5 kW in the 1980s and again to 10 kW by the 2000s.

In early 2019, XETIA-AM ditched its Radio Vital health talk format for Sabrosita, programmed by Mexico City-based NRM Comunicaciones and largely a simulcast of its XEPH-AM 590 AM.

On June 22, 2019, Sabrosita stopped broadcasting, with XETIA returning to Radio Vital.

References

Radio stations in Guadalajara